is a railway station on the Seibu Shinjuku Line in Suginami, Tokyo, Japan, operated by the private railway operator Seibu Railway.

Lines

History
Kami-Igusa Station opened on 16 April 1927. Station numbering was introduced on all Seibu Railway lines during fiscal 2012, with Kami-Igusa Station becoming "SS12".

On 23 March 2008, a bronze statue of the RX-78-2 Gundam was erected at the south entrance of the station to honor the animation studio Sunrise, which is located in Suginami.

Passenger statistics
In fiscal 2013, the station was the 51st busiest on the Seibu network with an average of 20,030 passengers daily. The passenger figures for previous years are as shown below.

See also
 List of railway stations in Japan

References

External links

Kami-Igusa station information 

Railway stations in Tokyo
Railway stations in Japan opened in 1927